Lata Priyakumar was an Indian politician and former member of the legislative assembly of Tamil Nadu. She was elected to the Tamil Nadu legislative assembly as an Indian National Congress candidate from Arakkonam constituency in the 1991 election. She is the daughter of the Indian politician and former member of parliament Maragatham Chandrasekar.

References 

Indian National Congress politicians from Tamil Nadu
Living people
Year of birth missing (living people)
Tamil Nadu MLAs 1991–1996